Dinganglung Gangmei, also known as Dipu Gangmei, is an Indian bureaucrat turned politician. He was an IAS officer before taking voluntary retirement to contest an election in January 2022. He was elected to the Manipur Legislative Assembly from Nungba in the 2022 Manipur Legislative Assembly election, defeating the six-times MLA and Congress Working Committee member Gaikhangam. On 11 April 2022, he was elected chairman of the Hill Area committee of the Manipur Legislative Assembly.

References

Naga people
Living people
Manipur MLAs 2022–2027
Bharatiya Janata Party politicians from Manipur
1979 births
People from Tamenglong district
Jawaharlal Nehru University alumni
Social workers from Manipur